Gamma-ray spectroscopy is the quantitative study of the energy spectra of gamma-ray sources, such as in the nuclear industry, geochemical investigation, and astrophysics.

Most radioactive sources produce gamma rays, which are of various energies and intensities. When these emissions are detected and analyzed with a spectroscopy system, a gamma-ray energy spectrum can be produced.

A detailed analysis of this spectrum is typically used to determine the identity and quantity of gamma emitters present in a gamma source, and is a vital tool in radiometric assay. The gamma spectrum is characteristic of the gamma-emitting nuclides contained in the source, just like in an optical spectrometer, the optical spectrum is characteristic of the material contained in a sample.

Gamma ray characteristics

Gamma rays are the highest-energy form of electromagnetic radiation, being physically the same as all other forms (e.g., X-rays, visible light, infrared, radio) but having (in general) higher photon energy due to their shorter wavelength.  Because of this, the energy of gamma-ray photons can be resolved individually, and a gamma-ray spectrometer can measure and display the energies of the gamma-ray photons detected.

Radioactive nuclei (radionuclides) commonly emit gamma rays in the energy range from a few keV to ~10 MeV, corresponding to the typical energy levels in nuclei with reasonably long lifetimes.  Such sources typically produce gamma-ray "line spectra" (i.e., many photons emitted at discrete energies), whereas much higher energies (upwards of 1 TeV) may occur in the continuum spectra observed in astrophysics and elementary particle physics. The difference between gamma rays and X-rays is somewhat blurred. Gamma rays are always from electronic emission of atoms and are mono energetic, whereas X-rays are electrically generated (X-ray tube, linear accelerator) and have a broad energy  range.

Components of a gamma spectrometer 

The main components of a gamma spectrometer are the energy-sensitive radiation detector and the electronic devices that analyse the detector output signals, such as a pulse sorter (i.e., multichannel analyzer). Additional components may include signal amplifiers, rate meters, peak position stabilizers, and data handling devices.

Detector 
Gamma spectroscopy detectors are passive materials that are able to interact with incoming gamma rays. The most important interaction mechanisms are the photoelectric effect, the Compton effect, and pair production. Through these processes, the energy of the gamma ray is absorbed and converted into a voltage signal by detecting the energy difference before and after the interaction  (or, in a scintillation counter, the emitted photons using a photomultiplier). The voltage of the signal produced is proportional to the energy of the detected gamma ray. Common detector materials include sodium iodide (NaI) scintillation counters and high-purity germanium detectors. 

To accurately determine the energy of the gamma ray, it is advantageous if the photoelectric effect occurs, as it absorbs all of the energy of the incident ray. Absorbing all the energy is also possible when a series of these interaction mechanisms take place within the detector volume. With Compton interaction or pair production, a portion of the energy may escape from the detector volume, without being absorbed. The absorbed energy thus gives rise to a signal that behaves like a signal from a ray of lower energy. This leads to a spectral feature overlapping the regions of lower energy. Using larger detector volumes reduces this effect.

Data acquisition 
The voltage pulses produced for every gamma ray that interacts within the detector volume are then analyzed by a multichannel analyzer (MCA). It takes the transient voltage signal and reshapes it into a Gaussian or trapezoidal shape. From this shape, the signal is then converted into a digital form. In some systems, the analog-to-digital conversion is performed before the peak is reshaped. The analog-to-digital converter (ADC) also sorts the pulses by their height into specific bins, or channels. Each channel represents a specific range of energy in the spectrum, the number of detected signals for each channel represents the spectral intensity of the radiation in this energy range. By changing the number of channels, it is possible to fine-tune the spectral resolution and sensitivity.
 A multichannel analyzer uses a fast ADC to record incoming pulses and stores information about pulses in one of two ways:

The multichannel analyzer output is sent to a computer, which stores, displays, and analyzes the data. A variety of software packages are available from several manufacturers, and generally include spectrum analysis tools such as energy calibration, peak area and net area calculation, and resolution calculation.

Detector performance
Gamma spectroscopy systems are selected to take advantage of several performance characteristics.  Two of the most important include detector resolution and detector efficiency.

Detector resolution 
Gamma rays detected in a spectroscopic system produce peaks in the spectrum. These peaks can also be called lines by analogy to optical spectroscopy. The width of the peaks is determined by the resolution of the detector, a very important characteristic of gamma spectroscopic detectors, and high resolution enables the spectroscopist to separate two gamma lines that are close to each other. Gamma spectroscopy systems are designed and adjusted to produce symmetrical peaks of the best possible resolution. The peak shape is usually a Gaussian distribution. In most spectra the horizontal position of the peak is determined by the gamma ray's energy, and the area of the peak is determined by the intensity of the gamma ray and the efficiency of the detector.

The most common figure used to express detector resolution is full width at half maximum (FWHM). This is the width of the gamma ray peak at half of the highest point on the peak distribution. Resolution figures are given with reference to specified gamma ray energies. Resolution can be expressed in absolute (i.e., eV or MeV) or relative terms. For example, a sodium iodide (NaI) detector may have a FWHM of 9.15 keV at 122 keV, and 82.75 keV at 662 keV. These resolution values are expressed in absolute terms. To express the resolution in relative terms, the FWHM in eV or MeV is divided by the energy of the gamma ray and usually shown as percentage. Using the preceding example, the resolution of the detector is 7.5% at 122 keV, and 12.5% at 662 keV. A germanium detector may give resolution of 560 eV at 122 keV, yielding a relative resolution of 0.46%.

Detector efficiency
Not all gamma rays emitted by the source that pass through the detector will produce a count in the system. The probability that an emitted gamma ray will interact with the detector and produce a count is the efficiency of the detector. High-efficiency detectors produce spectra in less time than low-efficiency detectors. In general, larger detectors have higher efficiency than smaller detectors, although the shielding properties of the detector material are also important factors. Detector efficiency is measured by comparing a spectrum from a source of known activity to the count rates in each peak to the count rates expected from the known intensities of each gamma ray.

Efficiency, like resolution, can be expressed in absolute or relative terms. The same units are used (i.e., percentages); therefore, the spectroscopist must take care to determine which kind of efficiency is being given for the detector. Absolute efficiency values represent the probability that a gamma ray of a specified energy passing through the detector will interact and be detected. Relative efficiency values are often used for germanium detectors, and compare the efficiency of the detector at 1332 keV to that of a 3 in × 3 in NaI detector (i.e., 1.2×10 −3 cps/Bq at 25 cm). Relative efficiency values greater than one hundred percent can therefore be encountered when working with very large germanium detectors.

The energy of the gamma rays being detected is an important factor in the efficiency of the detector. An efficiency curve can be obtained by plotting the efficiency at various energies. This curve can then be used to determine the efficiency of the detector at energies different from those used to obtain the curve. High-purity germanium (HPGe) detectors typically have higher sensitivity.

Scintillation detectors
Scintillation detectors use crystals that emit light when gamma rays interact with the atoms in the crystals. The intensity of the light produced is usually proportional to the energy deposited in the crystal by the gamma ray; a well known situation where this relationship fails is the absorption of < 200 keV radiation by intrinsic and doped sodium iodide detectors. The mechanism is similar to that of a thermoluminescent dosimeter. The detectors are joined to photomultipliers; a photocathode converts the light into electrons; and then by using dynodes to generate electron cascades through delta ray production, the signal is amplified. Common scintillators include thallium-doped sodium iodide (NaI(Tl))—often simplified to sodium iodide (NaI) detectors—and bismuth germanate (BGO). Because photomultipliers are also sensitive to ambient light, scintillators are encased in light-tight coverings.

Scintillation detectors can also be used to detect alpha- and beta-radiation.

Sodium iodide-based detectors

Thallium-doped sodium iodide (NaI(Tl)) has two principal advantages:
 It can be produced in large crystals, yielding good efficiency, and
 it produces intense bursts of light compared to other spectroscopic scintillators.
NaI(Tl) is also convenient to use, making it popular for field applications such as the identification of unknown materials for law enforcement purposes.

Electron hole recombination will emit light that can re-excite pure scintillation crystals; however, the thallium dopant in NaI(Tl) provides energy states within the band gap between the conduction and valence bands. Following excitation in doped scintillation crystals, some electrons in the conduction band will migrate to the activator states; the downward transitions from the activator states will not re-excite the doped crystal, so the crystal is transparent to this radiation.

An example of a NaI spectrum is the gamma spectrum of the caesium isotope —see Figure 1.  emits a single gamma line of 662 keV.

The spectrum in Figure 1 was measured using a NaI-crystal on a photomultiplier, an amplifier, and a multichannel analyzer. The figure shows the number of counts within the measuring period versus channel number. The spectrum indicates the following peaks (from left to right):
 low energy x radiation (due to internal conversion of the gamma ray),
 backscatter at the low energy end of the Compton distribution, and
 a photopeak (full energy peak) at an energy of 662 keV

The Compton distribution is a continuous distribution that is present up to channel 150 in Figure 1. The distribution arises because of primary gamma rays undergoing Compton scattering within the crystal: Depending on the scattering angle, the Compton electrons have different energies and hence produce pulses in different energy channels.

If many gamma rays are present in a spectrum, Compton distributions can present analysis challenges. To reduce gamma rays, an anticoincidence shield can be used—see Compton suppression. Gamma ray reduction techniques are especially useful for small lithium-doped germanium (Ge(Li)) detectors.

The gamma spectrum shown in Figure 2 is of the cobalt isotope , with two gamma rays with 1.17 MeV and 1.33 MeV respectively. (See the decay scheme article for the decay scheme of cobalt-60.) The two gamma lines can be seen well-separated; the peak to the left of channel 200 most likely indicates a strong background radiation source that has not been subtracted. A backscatter peak can be seen at channel 150, similar to the second peak in Figure 1.

Sodium iodide systems, as with all scintillator systems, are sensitive to changes in temperature. Changes in the operating temperature caused by changes in environmental temperature will shift the spectrum on the horizontal axis. Peak shifts of tens of channels or more are commonly observed. Such shifts can be prevented by using spectrum stabilizers.

Because of the poor resolution of NaI-based detectors, they are not suitable for the identification of complicated mixtures of gamma ray-producing materials. Scenarios requiring such analyses require detectors with higher resolution.

Semiconductor-based detectors

Semiconductor detectors, also called solid-state detectors, are fundamentally different from scintillation detectors: They rely on detection of the charge carriers (electrons and holes) generated in semiconductors by energy deposited by gamma ray photons.

In semiconductor detectors, an electric field is applied to the detector volume. An electron in the semiconductor is fixed in its valence band in the crystal until a gamma ray interaction provides the electron enough energy to move to the conduction band. Electrons in the conduction band can respond to the electric field in the detector, and therefore move to the positive contact that is creating the electrical field. The gap created by the moving electron is called a "hole", and is filled by an adjacent electron. This shuffling of holes effectively moves a positive charge to the negative contact. The arrival of the electron at the positive contact and the hole at the negative contact produces the electrical signal that is sent to the preamplifier, the MCA, and on through the system for analysis. The movement of electrons and holes in a solid-state detector is very similar to the movement of ions within the sensitive volume of gas-filled detectors such as ionization chambers.

Common semiconductor-based detectors include germanium, cadmium telluride, and cadmium zinc telluride.

Germanium detectors provide significantly improved energy resolution in comparison to sodium iodide detectors, as explained in the preceding discussion of resolution. Germanium detectors produce the highest resolution commonly available today. However, a disadvantage is the requirement of cryogenic temperatures for the operation of germanium detectors, typically by cooling with liquid nitrogen.

Interpretation of measurements

Backscatter peak
In a real detector setup, some photons can and will undergo one or potentially more Compton scattering processes (e.g. in the housing material of the radioactive source, in shielding material or material otherwise surrounding the experiment) before entering the detector material. The detailed shape of backscatter peak structure is influenced by many factors, such as the geometry of the experiment (source geometry, relative position of source, shielding and detector) or the type of the surrounding material (giving rise to different ratios of the cross sections of Photo- and Compton-effect).

The basic principle, however, is as follows:
 Gamma-ray sources emit photons isotropically
 Some photons will undergo a Compton scattering process in e.g. the shielding material or the housing of the source with a scattering angle close to 180° and some of these photons will subsequently be detected by the detector.
 The result is a peak structure with approximately the energy of the incident photon minus the energy of the Compton edge.

Single escape and double escape peaks
For incident photon energies E larger than two times the rest mass of the electron (1.022 MeV), pair production can occur. The resulting positron annihilates with one of the surrounding electrons, typically producing two photons with 511 keV. In a real detector (i.e. a detector of finite size) it is possible that after the annihilation:

 Both photons deposit their energy in the detector.
 One of the two photons escapes the detector and only one of the photons deposits its energy in the detector, resulting in a peak with  E − 511 keV, the single escape peak.
 Both photons escape the detector, resulting in a peak with  E − 2 × 511 keV, the double escape peak.

The above Am-Be-source spectrum shows an example of single and double escape peak in a real measurement.

Calibration and background radiation
If a gamma spectrometer is used for identifying samples of unknown composition, its energy scale must be calibrated first. Calibration is performed by using the peaks of a known source, such as caesium-137 or cobalt-60. Because the channel number is proportional to energy, the channel scale can then be converted to an energy scale. If the size of the detector crystal is known, one can also perform an intensity calibration, so that not only the energies but also the intensities of an unknown source—or the amount of a certain isotope in the source—can be determined.

Because some radioactivity is present everywhere (i.e., background radiation), the spectrum should be analyzed when no source is present. The background radiation must then be subtracted from the actual measurement. Lead absorbers can be placed around the measurement apparatus to reduce background radiation.

See also
 Alpha-particle spectroscopy
 Gamma probe
 Gamma ray spectrometer
 Isomeric shift
 Liquid scintillation counting
 Mass spectrometry
 Mössbauer spectroscopy
 Perturbed angular correlation
 Pandemonium effect
 Total absorption spectroscopy
 Scintillation counter
 X-ray spectroscopy

Works cited
Gilmore G, Hemingway J. Practical Gamma-Ray Spectrometry. John Wiley & Sons, Chichester: 1995, .
Knoll G, Radiation Detection and Measurement. John Wiley & Sons, Inc. NY:2000, .
Nucleonica Wiki. Gamma Spectrum Generator. Accessed 8 October 2008.

References

External links
 Amateur gamma spectrometry of a chunk of a black mold picked in Minamisoma, close to the Fukushima Dai-ichi nuclear plant. Japan. 
 On-line gamma-ray energy spectrum conversion utility

Spectrometers
Spectroscopy
Nuclear physics
Radioactivity
Gamma rays